Elateriospermum is a monotypic plant genus in the family Euphorbiaceae. The genus is the only member of  tribe Elateriospermeae and contains a singles species, Elateriospermum tapos. It is found from Southern Thailand,  Peninsular Malaysia, Borneo, Java, and Sumatra. and known locally as buah perah or perah tree.

This plant (kra) is mentioned in Thai literature.

It has poisonous fruits which can be rendered edible after careful preparation.

formerly included in genus
moved to Blumeodendron 
Elateriospermum paucinervium Elmer - Blumeodendron tokbrai 
Elateriospermum tokbrai Blume - Blumeodendron tokbrai

References

Monotypic Euphorbiaceae genera
Crotonoideae
Flora of Thailand
Flora of Malesia